Commander Bond may refer to:

 James Bond (literary character), fictional character with the rank of Commander in the British Royal Navy
 CommanderBond.net, James Bond 007 fansite

See also
 Bond (surname)